Apseudopsis is a genus of crustaceans belonging to the family Apseudidae. The genus has almost cosmopolitan distribution.

Species
The following species are accepted by the World Register of Marine Species:

 Apseudopsis acutifrons (Sars, 1882)
 Apseudopsis adami Esquete & Bamber, 2012
 Apseudopsis annabensis (Gutu, 2002)
 Apseudopsis apocryphus (Gutu, 2002)
 Apseudopsis arguinensis (Gutu, 2002)
 Apseudopsis bacescui (Gutu, 2002)
 Apseudopsis bruneinigma (Bamber, 1999)
 Apseudopsis caribbeanus Gutu, 2006
 Apseudopsis cuanzanus Bochert, 2012
 Apseudopsis elisae (Bacescu, 1961)
 Apseudopsis erythraeicus (Bacescu, 1984)
 Apseudopsis formosus Carvalho, Pereira & Esquete, 2019
 Apseudopsis gabesi Esquete, 2019
 Apseudopsis hastifrons (Norman & Stebbing, 1886)
 Apseudopsis isochelatus Gutu, 2006
 Apseudopsis latreillii (Milne Edwards, 1828)
 Apseudopsis mediterraneus (Bacescu, 1961)
 Apseudopsis minimus (Gutu, 2002)
 Apseudopsis olimpiae (Gutu, 1986)
 Apseudopsis opisthoscolops Bamber, Chatterjee & Marshall, 2012
 Apseudopsis ostroumovi Bacescu & Carausu, 1947
 Apseudopsis rogi Esquete, 2016
 Apseudopsis tridens (Gutu, 2002)
 Apseudopsis tuski (Błażewicz-Paszkowycz & Bamber, 2007)
 Apseudopsis uncidigitatus (Norman & Stebbing, 1886)

References

Tanaidacea
Crustacean genera